Taipei POP Radio FM91.7 is a Taiwanese Mandopop radio station, began broadcasting on November 25, 1995. It replaced Hit FM as the seventh, Taiwan-based, contributing radio station member of the Global Chinese Pop Chart.

References

External links
 FM91.7 homepage (Chinese)

Mandarin-language radio stations
Radio stations in Taiwan
Mass media in Taipei